The 2015 Soul Train Music Awards was held at the Orleans Arena in Las Vegas, Nevada, on Centric and BET on November 29, 2015. Jill Scott was honored with Soul Train Awards' first ever Lady of Soul Award. The ceremony, hosted by Erykah Badu, honored artists in 12 different categories. American singer, songwriter and poet Jill Scott was honored with the Lady of Soul Award for her contributions to the music industry.

Special awards

Legend Award
Babyface

Lady of Soul Award
 Jill Scott

Winners and nominees
Winners are listed first and highlighted in bold.

Album of the Year
 The Weeknd – Beauty Behind the Madness
 Chris Brown – X
 D'Angelo and the Vanguard – Black Messiah
 Jill Scott – Woman
 Tyrese – Black Rose

Song of the Year
 Mark Ronson  – "Uptown Funk"
 Common and John Legend – "Glory"
 Jidenna and Roman GianArthur – "Classic Man"
 Rihanna – "B**** Better Have My Money"
 The Weeknd – "Earned It"

Video of the Year
 Mark Ronson  – "Uptown Funk"
 Beyoncé – "7/11"
 Jidenna and Roman GianArthur – "Classic Man"
 Kendrick Lamar – "Alright"
 The Weeknd – "Earned It (Fifty Shades of Grey)"

The Ashford & Simpson Songwriter's Award
 Common and John Legend – "Glory"
 Written by: Lonnie Lynn, John Stephens and Che Smith
 J. Cole – "Apparently"
 Written by: Jermaine Cole, Damon Coleman and Filippo Trecca
 Mark Ronson  – "Uptown Funk"
 Written by: Mark Ronson, Rudolph Taylor, Lonnie Simmons, Philip Lawrence, Peter Hernandez, Jeff Bhasker, Nicholas Williams, Devon Gallaspy, Robert Wilson, Charles Wilson and Ronnie Wilson
 The Weeknd – "Earned It (Fifty Shades of Grey)"
 Written by: Abel Tesfaye, Ahmad Balshe, Jason Quenneville and Stephan Moccio
 Tyrese – "Shame"
 Written by: Tyrese Gibson, Warryn Campbell, Sam Dees, Ron Kersey and DJ Rogers, Jr.

Best R&B/Soul Male Artist
 The Weeknd
 Chris Brown
 D'Angelo and the Vanguard
 Tyrese
 Trey Songz

Best R&B/Soul Female Artist
 Jill Scott
 Beyoncé
 Tamar Braxton
 Janet Jackson
 Janelle Monáe

Best New Artist
 Jidenna
 Alessia Cara
 Dej Loaf
 Jussie Smollett
 Tinashe

Centric Certified Award
 Tyrese
 Avant
 Vivian Green
 The Internet
 Chrisette Michele

Best Gospel/Inspirational Song
 Lecrae – "All I Need is You"
 Erica Campbell – "More Love"
 Fred Hammond and BreeAnn Hammond – "I Will Trust"
 Kirk Franklin – "Wanna Be Happy?"
 Marvin Sapp – "Yes You Can"

Best Hip-Hop Song of the Year
 Kendrick Lamar – "Alright"
 Big Sean  – "Blessing"
 Big Sean  – "IDFWU"
 Fetty Wap – "Trap Queen"
 Nicki Minaj  – "Truffle Butter"

Best Dance Performance
 Silentó – "Watch Me (Whip/Nae Nae)"
 Beyoncé – "7/11"
 Chris Brown and Tyga – "Ayo"
 Janelle Monáe and Jidenna – "Yoga"
 Mark Ronson  – "Uptown Funk"

Best Collaboration
 Omarion  – "Post to Be"
 Big Sean  – "Blessing"
 Common and John Legend – "Glory"
 Mark Ronson  – "Uptown Funk"
 Nicki Minaj  – "Feeling Myself"

References

Soul
Soul Train Music Awards
Soul
Soul
Soul
Soul Train Music Awards 2015